Mark Antony De Wolfe Howe Jr. (August 23, 1864 – December 6, 1960) was an American editor and author, a recipient of the 1925 Pulitzer Prize for Biography or Autobiography.

Biography
Howe was born in Bristol, Rhode Island, the son of Bishop Mark Antony De Wolfe Howe and Eliza Whitney. In 1886, he graduated from Lehigh University and in 1887 from Harvard University (Master of Arts, 1888).

He served as associate editor of the Youth's Companion from 1888 to 1893 and from 1899 to 1913 He also served as assistant editor of the Atlantic Monthly in 1893-1895, and as editor of the Harvard Alumni Bulletin until 1913. He was vice president of the Atlantic Monthly company from 1911 to 1929. As an author, he won the 1925 Pulitzer Prize for Biography or Autobiography for Barrett Wendell and His Letters. He was the editor of Harvard Volunteers in Europe in 1916. He received an honorary Litt. D. from Lehigh in 1916.

In 1899, he married Fanny Huntington Quincy (1870–1933), an essayist and author, who was a sister to Josiah Quincy (1859–1919)  The couple had two sons and one daughter: journalist Quincy Howe (1900-1977), author Helen Huntington Howe (1905-1975), and Mark De Wolfe Howe (1906-1967), Harvard law professor and civil rights leader. He lived in Boston, and had a summer home in Cotuit, Massachusetts. He died at the home of his son Mark in Cambridge, Massachusetts.

Published works
Besides editing The Memory of Lincoln (1889), Home Letters of General Sherman (1909), The Beacon Biographies (31 volumes, 1899–1910), and Lines of Battle and Other Poems by Henry Howard Brownell (1912), he published the following:
 Shadows (1897)
 American Bookmen (1898)
 Phillips Brooks (1899)
 Boston: The Place and People (1903)
 Life and Letters of George Bancroft (1908)
 Harmonics: A Book of Verse (1909)
 Boston Common: Scenes from Four Centuries (1910)
 Life and Labors of Bishop Hare, Apostle to the Sioux (1911)
 Letters of Charles Eliot Norton (1813), with Sara Norton
 The Boston Symphony Orchestra (1914)
 The Harvard Volunteers in Europe (1916)
 The Humane Society of the Commonwealth of Massachusetts (1918)
 The Atlantic Monthly and Its Makers (1919)
 George von Lengerke Meyer, His Life and Public Services (1919)
 Memoirs of the Harvard Dead in the War against Germany two volumes, (1920, 1921)
 Classic Shades (1928)
 Who Lived Here? (1952)

See also

 DeWolf family

Notes and references

 Encyclopedia Americana (Volume 14: 1969) page 457.

External links

 
 

Lehigh University alumni
Harvard University alumni
American biographers
American male biographers
Pulitzer Prize for Biography or Autobiography winners
1864 births
1960 deaths
People from Bristol, Rhode Island
People from Boston
People from Cotuit, Massachusetts
DeWolf family
Members of the American Academy of Arts and Letters